Fusarium pallidoroseum is a fungal plant pathogen infecting banana, maize and pigeonpea.

References

External links 
 Index Fungorum
 USDA ARS Fungal Database

pallidoroseum
Fungal plant pathogens and diseases
Banana diseases
Maize diseases
Vegetable diseases
Fungi described in 1886